The European Anti-Poverty Network (EAPN) is the largest European network of national, regional and local networks, involving anti-poverty non-governmental organisations (NGOs) and grass-root groups as well as European organisations, active in the fight against poverty and social exclusion. It was established in 1990.

Supported by the European Commission, EAPN is a network of 31 National Networks of voluntary organisations and grass-root groups active in the fight against poverty within the 27 European Union member states (minus Slovenia), as well as in Norway, Iceland, Serbia, and North Macedonia. EAPN's membership also includes 13 European organisations. EAPN has a consultative status with the Council of Europe and is a founding member of the Platform of European Social NGOs.

Core objectives
To promote and enhance the effectiveness of actions to eradicate poverty and prevent social exclusion;
To raise awareness of poverty and social exclusion
To empower the people living in poverty and social exclusion
To lobby for and with people and groups facing poverty and social exclusion.
EAPN includes the objectives of gender equality and non discrimination in all its areas of work.

Activities
To address its objectives, the EAPN lobbies European and national decision-making institutions to develop and implement inclusive, anti-poverty policies and programmes, and keeps under close review  policies and programmes likely to impact on groups facing poverty and social exclusion.

It also acts as a central European forum for anti poverty focused NGOs, exchanging information on EU and national level anti poverty and exclusion policies; it supports members in exchanging experiences and building partnerships; and provides training for its members. It is also forging links and alliances with like-minded groups and coalitions.

Resources

The EAPN website gives access to key EAPN and EU documents on poverty, social exclusion and inequalities. EAPN produces wide a range of materials and publications on poverty, social inclusion, social protection, employment, Structural Funds.

References

External links
 
 EAPN on Twitter: @EAPNEurope
 EAPN on Facebook: EuropeanAntiPovertyNetwork
 EAPN on LinkedIn: EAPN - European Anti Poverty Network
 European Meetings of People experiencing Poverty (//voicesofpoverty-eu.net/)
Organised and coordinated by EAPN, the European meetings contribute to the right of people living in poverty to participate in and access information relating to the decision-making processes that affect their lives and well-being. The European meeting is the most visible point in the process of fostering this but perhaps even more important is the fact that they act as a catalyst for national participation processes.

 European Minimum Income Network (EMIN) (//emin-eu.net) The European Minimum Income Network (EMIN) is a project funded by the European Commission and which started in 2013. The aim of the project is to build consensus to take the necessary steps towards the progressive realisation of adequate and accessible minimum income schemes in EU Member States, in line with the European Commission's Active Inclusion Recommendation of 2008, the Europe 2020 strategy and in the context of the European Platform against Poverty and Social Exclusion.
 EU Alliance for a democratic, social and sustainable European Semester (Semester Alliance) (//semesteralliance.net)
The EU Alliance for a democratic, social and sustainable European Semester or (EU Semester Alliance) is a broad coalition bringing together major European civil-society organisations and trade unions, representing thousands of member organisations on the ground at European, national and local levels in the European Union.
The ‘Semester Alliance’ aims to support progress towards a more democratic, social and sustainable Europe 2020 Strategy, through strengthening civil dialogue engagement in the European Semester at national and EU levels.

Organizations established in 1990
Political organizations based in Europe
International organisations based in Belgium
Cross-European advocacy groups
Poverty-related organizations
Poverty in Europe